The 1919–20 team finished with a record of 12–2. It was the 3rd year for head coach Elton J. Rynearson.

Schedule

|-
!colspan=9 style="background:#006633; color:#FFFFFF;"| Non-conference regular season

References

https://emueagles.com/sports/2018/11/7/2018-19-mens-basketball-media-guide.aspx?id=943

Eastern Michigan Eagles men's basketball seasons
Michigan State Normal